Heiko Rannula (born July 28, 1983) is an Estonian professional basketball coach and former player, who is currently a head coach for Kalev/Cramo, and an assistant for Jukka Toijala in Estonian National Team.

Professional player career 
Heiko Rannula graduated from Tartu Karlova Gymnasium in 2001. He started training with Jüri Neissaare. He has played in the Estonian youth (U16) and junior (U20) teams. He has also been a member of the Estonian National team. Rannula is the Estonian youth champion in the U16 and U20 age classes. He became the Estonian champion with Tartu team in 2001 and 2004, in addition to winning the Estonian Cup in 2002 and 2004. He played for several Estonian basketball clubs.

Coaching 
He started working as an assistant coach at KK Pärnu in 2015, but was promoted the head coach in 2016. Under his guidance, the club has won a bronze medal at the Estonian league in 2019 and a silver medal in 2021. In 2022, he became the Estonian Champion. In summer 2022, Rannula became the head coach for Estonian most ambitious team BC Kalev.

He has worked as an assistant coach for the Estonian U18 and U20 youth teams. Since 2019, he is the assistant coach of the Estonian men's national team.

References 

1983 births
Living people
Estonian men's basketball players
Estonian basketball coaches